The Church of Saint Catherine is a late Byzantine church in the northwestern corner of the Ano Poli, Thessaloniki, Greece.

History 
The church dates to the Palaiologan period, but its exact dating and original dedication are unknown. From its interior decoration, which survives in fragments and is dated to ca. 1315, it has been suggested that it was the katholikon of the Monastery of the Almighty. It was converted to a mosque by Yakup Pasha in the reign of the Ottoman sultan Bayezid II (r. 1481–1512) and named after him Yakup Pasha Mosque. In 1988, it was included among the Paleochristian and Byzantine monuments of Thessaloniki on the list of World Heritage Sites by UNESCO.

See also 
 History of Roman and Byzantine domes
 Hagios Demetrios

References

Sources 
 

Byzantine church buildings in Thessaloniki
World Heritage Sites in Greece
Mosques converted from churches in Ottoman Greece
14th-century Eastern Orthodox church buildings
Church buildings with domes
14th-century churches in Greece
Former mosques in Greece
14th-century establishments in the Byzantine Empire